Anaxarcha is the type genus of Asian praying mantids of the tribe Anaxarchini: in the family Hymenopodidae.

Species 
There are ten recognized species:
Anaxarcha acuta
Anaxarcha graminea
Anaxarcha hyalina
Anaxarcha intermedia
Anaxarcha limbata
Anaxarcha pulchella
Anaxarcha pulchra
Anaxarcha sinensis
Anaxarcha tianmushanensis
Anaxarcha zhengi

References

 
Acromantinae
Mantodea genera
Mantodea of Asia
Taxa named by Carl Stål